The Institute for Defense Analyses (IDA) is an American non-profit corporation that administers three federally funded research and development centers (FFRDCs) – the Systems and Analyses Center (SAC), the Science and Technology Policy Institute (STPI), and the Center for Communications and Computing (C&C) – to assist the United States government in addressing national security issues, particularly those requiring scientific and technical expertise. It is headquartered in Alexandria, Virginia.

History
Two ideas critical to the birth of the Institute for Defense Analyses, also known as IDA, emerged from World War II. The first was the necessity for unifying the several services into a single, coordinated department. The second was the realization of the strength of the relationship between science—and scientists—and national security.
The first reached fruition when President Harry Truman signed the National Security Acts of 1947 and 1949, creating the Department of Defense. (In 1947 the Department of War and the Department of the Navy had been combined to create the National Military Establishment. From it the present Defense Department was created in 1949.)

To give the nascent Office of the Secretary of Defense (OSD) the technical expertise and analytic resources to hold its own and to help make unification a reality, James Forrestal, the department's first secretary, established the Weapons Systems Evaluation Group (WSEG) in 1948 to assist OSD and the Organization of the Joint Chiefs of Staff by:

 Bringing scientific and technical as well as operational military expertise to bear in evaluating weapons systems;
 Employing advanced techniques of scientific analysis and operations research in the process; and
 Approaching its tasks from an impartial, supra-Service perspective.

The demands on WSEG were more than its small staff of military and civilian analysts could satisfy, and by the early years of the Dwight Eisenhower administration, there were calls for change. The several options gradually coalesced into one and, in 1955, the Secretary of Defense and the Chairman of the Joint Chiefs of Staff asked James R. Killian, Jr., then president of MIT, to help form a civilian, nonprofit research institute. The Institute would operate under the auspices of a university consortium to attract highly qualified scientists to assist WSEG in addressing the nation's most challenging security problems. And so, in April 1956, IDA was incorporated as a non-profit organization. In 1958, at the request of the Secretary of Defense, IDA established a division to support the newly created Advanced Research Projects Agency (ARPA), later renamed the Defense Advanced Research Projects Agency (DARPA). Shortly after its creation, the mandate of this division was broadened to include scientific and technical studies for all offices of the Director of Defense, Research and Engineering (DDR&E).

Universities overseeing IDA expanded from the five initial members in 1956 — Caltech, Case Western Reserve, MIT, Stanford and Tulane — to twelve by 1964 with the addition of California, Chicago, Columbia, Illinois, Michigan, Pennsylvania, and Princeton. University oversight of IDA ended in 1968 in the aftermath of Vietnam War-related demonstrations at Princeton, Columbia, and other member universities.

Subsequent divisions were established under what became IDA's largest research center, the Studies and Analyses Center (now the Systems and Analyses Center), to provide cost analyses, computer software and engineering, strategy and force assessments, and operational test and evaluation. IDA created the Simulation Center in the early 1990s to focus on advanced distributed simulation, and most recently, established the Joint Advanced Warfighting Program to develop new operational concepts.

IDA's support of the National Security Agency began at its request in 1959, when it established the Center for Communications Research in Princeton, New Jersey. Additional requests from NSA in 1984 and 1989 led respectively to what is now called the Center for Computing Sciences in Bowie, Maryland and to a second Center for Communications Research in La Jolla, California. These groups, which conduct research in cryptology and information operations, make up IDA's Communications and Computing FFRDC.

In 2003, IDA assumed responsibility for the Science and Technology Policy Institute, a separate FFRDC providing technical and analytic support to the Office of Science and Technology Policy and other executive branch organizations.

Throughout its history, IDA also has assisted other federal agencies. Recent work includes research performed in support of the Department of Homeland Security, the National Aeronautics and Space Administration, the Director of National Intelligence, and others.

Leadership
The following have served as president of IDA:
 James McCormack, 1956-1959 
 Garrison Norton, 1959-1962 
 Richard M. Bissell Jr., 1962-1964 
 Jack Ruina, 1964-1966 
 Maxwell D. Taylor, 1966-1969 
 Alexander H. Flax, 1969-1983 
 Andrew Goodpaster, 1983-1985 
 William Y. Smith, 1985-1990 
 Larry D. Welch, 1990-2003 
 Dennis C. Blair, 2003-2006 
 Larry D. Welch, 2006-2009 
 David S. C. Chu, 2009-2020
 Norton A. Schwartz, 2020–present

Sponsors
IDA's Federally Funded Research and Development Centers (FFRDCs), work with governmental sponsors and do not work for commercial enterprises or for-profit organizations.

The Systems and Analyses Center's primary sponsor is the Under Secretary of Defense for Acquisition, Technology and Logistics. SAC assists the Office of the Secretary of Defense, the Joint Chiefs of Staff, the Unified Combatant Commands, and Defense Agencies List of U.S. Department of Defense agencies in addressing national security issues, particularly those requiring scientific and technical expertise. With concurrence from the USD(AT&L), SAC also supports other sponsors – including the Veterans Administration Veteran's Administration; the Intelligence Community; U.S. Department of Homeland Security, U.S. Department of Commerce, and U.S. Department of Energy.

The Science and Technology Policy Institute provides analyses for the National Science Foundation as STPI's primary sponsor and the Office of Science and Technology Policy as its primary customer. STPI also provides analysis for the National Institutes of Health, the U.S. Department of Energy, the National Aeronautics and Space Agency, and other science-performing Federal agencies.

The Center for Communications and Computing supports the National Security Agency.

IDA's FFRDCs

Systems and Analyses Center

The Systems and Analyses Center (SAC) is the largest of IDA's three FFRDCs and is co-located with the IDA headquarters in Alexandria, Virginia. SAC assists the Office of the Secretary of Defense (OSD), the Joint Staff, the Combatant Commands, and Defense Agencies in addressing important national security issues, focusing particularly on those requiring scientific and technical expertise. It includes the following divisions:

Cost Analysis and Research Division (CARD) helps guide the Department of Defense and other federal agencies in the decisions, policies, and processes of resource – both people and money – allocation. Specifically, CARD analysts engage in:
    Evaluating costs for pending government acquisition or retention
    Examining resource allocation policies to guide sponsors’ decision
    Improving the efficiency and effectiveness of our sponsors’ resource allocation processes
  CARD also supports the Department of Homeland Security efforts to assess and validate new anti-terrorism systems as mandated by the Support Anti-Terrorism by Fostering Effective Technologies Act. Similar to the support to DoD, analysts provide the technical evaluation ensuring that proposed technologies are safe and effective.

Information Technology and Systems Division (ITSD) focuses on cybersecurity and other cyberspace challenges of national and global importance. ITSD researchers address all aspects of cyber from the perspectives of cyberspace operations, technology, and policy/law, and where these perspectives intersect. In particular, ITSD concentrates on these areas:
    Providing expertise on critical cyber technology procurements via in-depth knowledge of the technology and modern methods for timely acquisition of technology that matters.
    Assessing advanced concepts in rapidly changing cyber technologies while identifying and analyzing cyber risks.
    Analyzing the workforce to determine if they are ready for cyber challenges and developing training and education programs to ensure we are ready for future cyber challenges.
    Applying world-class talent in content understanding by analyzing Big Data to bring clarity to a world drowning in data
  ITSD researchers have performed assessments of existing DoD cyberspace organizational constructs, developed alternative technology strategies, and advised leaders on the most effective options to enhance cyberspace operations. Analysts also assist DoD and other governmental agencies in addressing problems related to real-world operations.

Intelligence Analyses Division (IAD) provides the United States Department of Defense, the Intelligence Community, and other cabinet departments research and analyses across a wide array of intelligence issues and disciplines. Specific examples of support to our national security include research in the following vital areas:
    Countering terrorism, including how terrorist organizations are financed; examining issues unique to Asian counterterrorism; and following developments in improvised explosive devices worldwide
    New technology, such as the use of tagging, tracking, and locating (TTL) systems, including the ability to defeat such systems, and measurement and signals intelligence (MASINT) applications, which deal with metric, angle, spatial, wavelength, time dependence, modulation, plasma, and hydromagnetic data
    Surprise technology – unanticipated technologies that might be employed against the U.S. by adversaries as the result of either scientific breakthroughs or novel applications of existing technologies.
    Cyberspace operations – tracking, analyzing, and countering digital security threats and identifying and tracking those developing, selling, and using cyber weapons on a global basis.

Joint Advanced Warfighting Division (JAWD) focuses on the needs of the joint force commander and, in particular, the future joint force commander. Provides analytic support to post-war programmatic decisions. As DoD reviews capabilities, JAWD provides an independent analytic review of the capabilities built during the war and which ones to maintain to support the joint concept. Specifically, the division is engaged in the following:
    Linking new concepts and new technologies to a military context
    Moving from concept to reality in the military environment
    Exploring military options through structured analysis.

Operational Evaluation Division (OED) provides technical analytical support to the DoD’s Director, Operational Test and Evaluation (DOT&E) and its mission to conduct independent assessments of the military services’ test and evaluation of new weapons systems. OED’s analytical support functions focus on:
    Conducting good tests of military systems in a realistic operational environment
    Evaluating those systems from an objective, disinterested, factually based perspective in terms of effectiveness and suitability
  OED also supports the Department of Homeland Security efforts to assess and validate new anti-terrorism systems as mandated by the Support Anti-Terrorism by Fostering Effective Technologies Act. Similar to the support to DoD, analysts provide the technical evaluation that proposed technologies are safe and effective.

Science and Technology Division (STD) provides analyses of science and technology issues related to national security. STD’s core strengths, which include:
    Electromagnetics
    Energy analysis
    Chemical, nuclear, biological detection
    Advanced optics
    Countering IEDs and mines
    Vehicle blast enhancements
    Materials and armor
    Training and human factors
    Robotic systems
  STD also manages DoD’s Defense Science Studies Group to strengthen connections between the federal government and relevant science and technology communities in academia. The DSSG introduces leading, recently tenured faculty to security challenges and related technology problems.

Strategy, Forces and Resources Division (SFRD) conducts comprehensive integrated, interdisciplinary studies of broad defense policy and long-range planning related to national strategy, organization, and management process issues. SFRD researchers and analysts conduct studies in several key areas:
    Analyzing Chemical, Biological, Radiological, and Nuclear (CBRN) defenses
    Conducting organizational effectiveness and human capital management studies
    Improving defense resource management
    Investigating international arms markets
    Researching international collaboration scenarios
    Evaluating force structure and capabilities as well as strategy and risk.

System Evaluation Division (SED) provides independent system evaluations, analyses of alternatives, assessments of technology integration, and special system studies for DoD, typically assisting our sponsors in the following tasks:
    Formulating and investigating new operational concepts and system architectures
    Examining force- and mission-level effectiveness
    Assessing the risks, costs, and benefits of new technology insertion
    Improving the developmental test and evaluation of major military systems

Science and Technology Policy Institute

The Science and Technology Policy Institute (STPI), is located in Washington, D.C. It provides objective analysis of science and technology (S&T) policy issues for the White House Office of Science and Technology Policy (OSTP) and other offices and councils within the executive branch of the U.S. government and federal agencies. Since IDA began operating it in 2003, STPI has provided support to OSTP on topics spanning the spectrum from the ethical, legal, and societal implications of nanotechnology research to aeronautics research and development; and from understanding the effects of U.S. visa policies to efforts that facilitate international research collaboration. In carrying out its work, STPI researchers consult widely with representatives from private industry, academia, and nonprofit organizations. STPI's key functions are to:
    Analyze the effect of current and proposed S&T policies on the long-term vitality of the United States
    Provide timely and authoritative information regarding significant S&T developments and trends in the United States and abroad, with particular attention to the federal S&T portfolio
    Advise OSTP and federal agencies on the implementation and evaluation of research and development programs
    Provide technical support and analysis to the President’s Council of Advisors on Science and Technology (PCAST) and to committees and panels of the National Science and Technology Council (NSTC), under the direction of OSTP

Center for Communications and Computing
In 1959, IDA's Center for Communications and Computing was formed (as the Communications Research Division) as a private think tank dedicated to helping the National Security Agency solve advanced cryptology problems. It was headed by Cornell professor of mathematics J. Barkley Rosser (1958–61); University of Chicago mathematics chairman Abraham Adrian Albert (1961–1962); Yale University professor of mathematics Gustav A. Hedlund (1962-1963); University of Illinois/Sandia Corporation mathematician Richard A. Leibler (1963–1977); and Princeton mathematician Lee Paul Neuwirth (1977-unknown).

More recently, the Centers, which now consist of a Center for Computing Sciences in Bowie, Maryland, and two Centers for Communications Research with offices in Princeton, New Jersey, and La Jolla, California, have also worked on network security issues.
Within those broad areas, the research portfolio particularly focuses on the creation and analysis of sophisticated encryption methods, high-speed computing technologies, the development of advanced algorithms and their applications, algorithmic and mathematical foundations of cryptology, computer network technologies supporting communications security, information processing technologies supporting cyber security, and analytical applications for large data sets.
Although the Centers in Princeton and La Jolla were founded to focus on the mathematics of cryptology, and the center in Bowie was founded to focus on computational science, all three have developed distinctive areas of expertise. Nonetheless, they work closely with each other and share many overlapping research teams.

Center for Communications Research, Princeton and Center for Communications Research, La Jolla. One Center was founded in 1959 in Princeton, New Jersey (originally called the Communications Research Division).  In 1989, a second Center was opened in La Jolla, California.  The two Centers employ more than 70 Ph.D. mathematicians and computer scientists, working on problems in cryptography, cryptanalysis, algorithms, high-performance computing, information processing, signal processing, and network security, as well as related areas of pure and applied mathematics. A surprisingly broad array of branches of the mathematical sciences have proved to be useful in this work, and this is reflected in the variety of backgrounds of the researchers at these Centers. The day-to-day work is aimed at providing practical solutions to important real-world problems faced by NSA, and this can range from deep mathematical investigations to writing advanced computer programs to sophisticated statistical analyses of data. The research environment is distinctive in encouraging close collaboration, multidisciplinary teams, tight coupling between theory and practice, and strong connections with the other Centers.

Center for Computing Sciences (CCS) was founded in 1985 in Bowie, Maryland. CCS focuses the skills of some of the country’s best computer scientists, engineers, and mathematicians on solving intelligence-related problems of importance to national security, and also on tackling problem sets of interest to the entire computational science world. CCS's original mission, the development and use of high-end computing, has expanded over the years to reflect global political and technological changes. In addition to high-performance computing for cryptography, it now includes cryptography itself, extensive projects in network security and related cyber issues, signal processing, and emerging algorithmic and mathematical techniques for analyzing extremely complex data sets. CCS works closely with National Security Agency and with US industry on the development of high-performance computing platforms – an effort that senior technology policymakers believe will require government research and development support. These platforms, aimed at meeting the specialized requirements of the most demanding national-security-related computations, will have to far exceed the capabilities of even the most sophisticated computers today. The Center is uniquely qualified to provide significant insight into this challenge, given its depth of experience in NSA’s most advanced computing problems; history of sustained and vigorous dialog with many of the nation's leading high-end computer makers; and active collaborations with the united States Department of Energy’s Lawrence Livermore National Laboratory, Sandia National Laboratories, and the Los Alamos National Laboratory.

Notable people associated with the Center for Communications and Computing

 Abraham Adrian Albert, CRD director (1961–1962)
 Leonard E. Baum
 Joe P. Buhler
 Don Coppersmith
 Alfred W. Hales
 Gustav A. Hedlund, CRD director
 Donald Knuth, 1968-1969
 Richard Leibler, CRD director
 Jill P. Mesirov
 Victor S. Miller, co-inventor of Elliptic Curve Cryptography
 Nick Patterson
 Eric M. Rains
 Coke Reed, CCR Princeton and CCS staff member
 Mary Lynn Reed
 David P. Robbins, CCR Princeton staff member (1980-2003)
 J. Barkley Rosser, CRD director (1958–1961)
 Jim Simons, CRD staff member (1964-1968)
 Lloyd R. Welch
 Malcolm J. Williamson, inventor of Diffie-Hellman key exchange

Staff
IDA employs approximately 1,500 research, professional, adjunct, and support staff. Many have attended the nation's military service academies or served in the military. Approximately 56% hold doctoral degrees; 36% hold master's degrees; and 8% hold bachelor's degrees. The staff specializes in the following research disciplines:

References

External links
 
 Science and Technology Policy Institute

Think tanks based in Washington, D.C.
Non-profit organizations based in Alexandria, Virginia
Federally Funded Research and Development Centers
Research institutes established in 1956
1956 establishments in Virginia
Research institutes in Virginia